The Ultimate Collection Tour (also known as Ultimate Collection Live) is the fourth headlining tour and first greatest hits tour by American recording artist, Anastacia. The tour supports her second greatest hits complication, Ultimate Collection The tour began April 2016 and played 100 shows in Europe. 

After her stint on Strictly Come Dancing, the singer announced the third leg of the tour. 

This was followed by forthcoming release of a live album of the tour. The album, A 4 App, was released on December 16, 2016. The album features fan requested songs chosen from her app. In May 2017, the singer released live recordings of the shows in Manchester and London.

Setlist
The following setlist was obtained from the April 4, 2016 concert held in Milan, Italy; at the Gran Teatro Linear4 Ciak. It does not represent all concerts throughout the tour. 
"Instrumental Sequence"
"Army of Me"
"Sick and Tired"
"Stupid Little Things"
"Instrumental Sequence"
"Paid My Dues"
"Welcome to My Truth"
"Pieces of a Dream"
"Why'd You Lie to Me"
"Cowboys & Kisses"
"The Saddest Part"
"In Your Eyes"
"Everything Burns"
"Dance Sequence" 
"Heavy on My Heart"
"Stay"
"You'll Never Be Alone"
"I Belong to You (Il Ritmo della Passione)"
"Instrumental Sequence"
"Not That Kind"
"Love Is a Crime"
"I'm Outta Love"
Encore
"Left Outside Alone"
"One Day in Your Life"

Tour dates

Festivals and other miscellaneous performances

This concert was a part of the "Festival Mil·lenni"
This concert was a part of "KulturPur"
This concert was a part of the "Esbjerg Rock Festival"
This concert was a part of the "Hampton Court Palace Festival"
This concert was a part of "Night at the Park"
This concert was a part of "Genk on Stage"
This concert was a part of "Bluetone"
This concert was a part of "Carpi Summer Fest"
This concert was a part of "Tysnesfest"
This concert was a part of "Tollwood Summerfestival"
This concert was a part of "Fantastival"
This concert was a part of "Sommersound"
This concert was a part of "Open-Air-Kino-Gelände Gießen"
This concert was a part of "Gru Village Festival"
This concert was a part of "Lucca Summer Festival"
This concert was a part of  "Rottweiler Ferienzauber"
This concert was a part of "Langelands Festival"
This concert was a part of "Qstock"
These concerts were a part of the "Night of the Proms"
This concert was a part of the "International Spring Snow Festival"
This concert was a part of "Moments in Music"
This concert was a part of "Noches del Botánico"
This concert was a part of "Arena Derthona"
The concert was a part of "FL1 Life"
This concert was a part of "Bospop"
This concert was a part of the "RDS Summer Song"
This concert was a part of the "Marostica Summer Festival"
This concert was a part of the "Festival de Cap Roig"
This concert was a part of the "Starlite Festival"
This concert was a part of the "Tuttlinger Honberg-Sommer"
This concert was a part of "Hohentwielfestival"
This concert was a part of "Zeltspektakel"
This concert was a part of the "Zelt-Musik-Festival"
This concert was a part of "Landesgartenschau"
This concert was a part of the "Rösler Open Air"
This concert was a part of "Calwer Klostersommer in Hirsau"
This concert was a part of "Trestokkfestivalen"
This concert was a part of "Musik im Park"
This concert was a part of the "Da Capo Festival"
This concert was a part of the "Sommertour"
This concert was a part of the "Warendorf Live"
This concert was a part of "Open.Air.Platz Troisdorf"
This concert was a part of the "Nostalgie Beach Festival"

Cancellations and rescheduled shows

Box office score data

Band
Drums: Steve Barney
Guitar: DeeRal Aldridge, Anders Grahn
Bass guitar: Orefo Orakwue
Keyboards: Gary Sanctuary
Backing vocalist: Maria Quintile
Dancers: Christine Anderson and Anjula Kelly-Nair

References

External links
Anastacia Official Website

Anastacia concert tours
2016 concert tours
2017 concert tours